In enzymology, a galactinol-sucrose galactosyltransferase is an enzyme that catalyzes the chemical reaction

alpha-D-galactosyl-(1->3)-1D-myo-inositol + sucrose  myo-inositol + raffinose

Thus, the two substrates of this enzyme are alpha-D-galactosyl-(1->3)-1D-myo-inositol and sucrose, whereas its two products are myo-inositol and raffinose.

This enzyme belongs to the family of glycosyltransferases, specifically the hexosyltransferases.  The systematic name of this enzyme class is alpha-D-galactosyl-(1->3)-myo-inositol:sucrose 6-alpha-D-galactosyltransferase. Other names in common use include 1-alpha-D-galactosyl-myo-inositol:sucrose, and 6-alpha-D-galactosyltransferase.  This enzyme participates in galactose metabolism.

References

 
 

EC 2.4.1
Enzymes of unknown structure